Papilio pericles is a butterfly of the family Papilionidae. it is found on Timor and the surrounding islands eastward to the Tanimbar archipelago.

The wingspan is 70–90 mm.

Other reading
Erich Bauer and Thomas Frankenbach, 1998 Schmetterlinge der Erde, Butterflies of the world Part I (1), Papilionidae Papilionidae I: Papilio, Subgenus Achillides, Bhutanitis, Teinopalpus. Edited by  Erich Bauer and Thomas Frankenbach.  Keltern : Goecke & Evers ; Canterbury : Hillside Books

External links
butterflycorner

pericles
Butterflies of Borneo
Butterflies of Java
Butterflies described in 1865